Vellerot-lès-Belvoir (literally Vellerot near Belvoir) is a commune in the Doubs department in the Bourgogne-Franche-Comté region in eastern France.

Population

See also 
 Belvoir
 Communes of the Doubs department

References

Communes of Doubs